Donna Tracy is a visual effects artist whose work on numerous feature films over more than 25 years includes Star Wars and Spider-Man. She deftly moved from traditional film, animation and visual effects to the digital production process in an ever-shifting and fickle industry. She applies this deftness to her installation artwork. A fine example is, "Cloudwoman", shown at the old Los Angeles Jail in 1998. It was a collaborative work with Jael Lehmann and Ann Monn that gave voice to Olive Oatman who became Cloudwoman. Another work of interest is a digital print series she created entitled, "Virtual Species or Digital Waste" (2005), that was developed out of small discarded and unused scraps of texture patches salvaged from the digital dustbins of the digital film making process. This discarded digital trash is called "digitritus" (digital detritus). She likens it to peeling paint or bark that inspires one to create something else out of it. She has presented, written and published about copyright issues in regards to this work. Her master's degree in art studies was taken at the California Institute of the Arts in the Art Program. An animated work, Nichelodeon: A Peep Show, was projected in 2006 at the MOMA exhibition, TOMORROWLAND: CalArts in Moving Pictures, of former Cal Arts students work.

In 2001, she resigned from her position at Sony Pictures, to teach at Chaffey College. She has moved from there to start OmniCosm Studios with Adolf Schaller. They completed a commission for the Griffith Observatory in Los Angeles - a series of new planet landscapes, Mercury, Venus, Mars and Pluto - for the Deep Space Exhibit. She is working with Adolf Schaller and Michael Ferriter (Pure Light Images) on the creation of a 3D film series for multi-venue theater productions based on astronomical phenomena. Their first two productions are, Journey to a Black Hole 3D and Star Blast 3D: A Supernova Experience.

References

External links

David Pease, "Tracy will bring magical talents to digital lab", 3 December 2001

Special effects people
Living people
Visual effects artists
Year of birth missing (living people)